The 1990 Swedish Open was a combined men's and women's tennis tournament played on outdoor clay courts in Båstad, Sweden. It was part of the World Series of the 1990 ATP Tour and of the Tier V category of the 1990 WTA Tour. It was the 43rd edition of the tournament and was held from 9 July until 15 July 1990. Richard Fromberg and Sandra Cecchini won the singles titles.

Finals

Men's singles
 Richard Fromberg defeated  Magnus Larsson, 6–2, 7–6
 It was Fromberg's 2nd singles title of the year and of his career.

Women's singles
 Sandra Cecchini defeated  Csilla Bartos, 6–1, 6–2

Men's doubles
 Ronnie Båthman /  Rikard Bergh defeated  Jan Gunnarsson /  Udo Riglewski, 6–1, 6–4

Women's doubles
 Mercedes Paz /  Tine Scheuer-Larsen defeated  Carin Bakkum /  Nicole Muns-Jagerman 6–3, 6–7(10–12), 6–2

References

External links
 ITF tournament edition details